This is the list of railway stations located in Estonia. The list is incomplete.

References 

Estonia
 
Rail
Estonia